Gustavo Artunduaga Paredes Airport  is a public, domestic Colombian air terminal run by the Civil Aeronautics. It is the most important airport in Caquetá, with scheduled commercial cargo and passenger operations carried out through airlines such as Avianca and the state-owned Satena, as well as military, police and general aviation flights.

Access
The airport is between the villages of San Martin and Venice, in a place known colloquially as Capitolio on the road connecting the city of Florence with the municipality of La Montañita. To get there taxi service from the city limits of the city  is available as well as several bus routes that connect with the southeastern suburbs and downtown Florence. Additionally, some hotels offer transfer services airport-hotel-airport on request.

Description

Land side facilities
The passenger terminal has all the necessary infrastructure for passenger service, including check-in capacity for several airlines, nine stores, two restaurants, two departure lounges with capacity for 228 passengers, landing room with their respective luggage belts, six bathrooms, X-ray scanner, metal detectors, air conditioning, speakers, cargo hold, chapel, administrative offices and facilities for law enforcement, health services with permanent ambulance and car parking.

Air side facilities
The airport has an asphalt runway of 1500 m - 4921 ft - long with 12/30 direction, a platform of 3000 m2 with parking for six positions for general aviation, four commercial passenger aviation positions and four helicopters positions and three taxiways - alpha, bravo and charlie - that connect the platform to the southern section of the track. The control tower is 27 feet high, divided into nine levels. It is also equipped with a fire department of three levels provided with two machines for emergency care. 5 It also has infrastructure for fueling Jet A-1 and to serve nocturnal air navigation until 20:00 (UTC−5).

The Florencia VOR-DME (Ident: FLA) is located on the field.

There is high terrain north of the airport.

Airlines and destinations

Accidents and incidents
On 2 April 1976, Douglas DC-3 FAC-676 of SATENA crashed on approach. The aircraft was on a flight from Tres de Mayo Airport, Puerto Asís. Five of the 16 people on board were killed.
On 20 April 1993, Douglas C-47A CP-1622 of Trans Aéreos Cochabamba was damaged beyond repair in an accident at the airport. The port engine failed and both crew were killed in the accident.

See also
Transport in Colombia
List of airports in Colombia

References

External links

OpenStreetMap - Florencia
SkyVector - Florencia
Google Maps - Florencia

Airports in Colombia
Buildings and structures in Caquetá Department